This is a list of spouses of prime ministers of Japan. They have all been women.

Role and duties
The role of the prime minister's consort is not an official position, and so they are not given a salary or official duties.

Spouse of the prime ministers of the Japan

References

Japan